Galleh Zan (also known as Bāserī, Dorāh-e Galehzan, and Solūkolū) is a village in Abarj Rural District, Dorudzan District, Marvdasht County, Fars Province, Iran. At the 2006 census, its population was 483, in 105 families.

References 

Populated places in Marvdasht County